The Con & Annie Kirby Memorial Stakes is a greyhound racing competition held annually at Limerick Greyhound Stadium at Greenpark, Dock Road, Limerick, Ireland.

The competition quickly established itself as one of the leading feature events in the Irish racing calendar due to the significant prize money on offer.

It boasted a record €80,000 to the winner in 2014 making the competition one of the biggest prizes in greyhound racing and the richest juvenile race in the world. It was sponsored by J. P. McManus & Noreen McManus, and named in honour of Noreen McManus's parents, who had close ties with the old Limerick Markets Field Greyhound Stadium.

A series of trial stakes are run at different locations in preparation for the competition.

Past winners

Venues and distances 
2013-present 	(Limerick 525y)

References

Greyhound racing competitions in Ireland
Sport in Limerick (city)
Sport in County Limerick
Recurring sporting events established in 2013